This is a list of newspapers in Scotland.

Daily newspapers 
{| class="sortable wikitable"
! Title !! Market type !! Print !! Location !! Format !! Scottish circulation2017 !! Scottish circulation2016 !! Scottish circulation2015 !! Foundation date
|-
| The Herald || Scottish – Quality || Morning || Scottish || Broadsheet || 25,869 || 28,872 || 32,141 || 1783    
|-
| The Scotsman || Scottish – Quality || Morning || Scottish || Compact || 19,792 || 19,449 || 22,740 || 1817    
|-
| The National || Scottish – Tabloid || Morning || Scottish || Compact || 9,746 || 8,496 || 12,124 || 2014    
|-
| Daily Record || Scottish – Popular || Morning || Scottish || Tabloid || || || || 1895    
|-
| The Press and Journal || Regional || Morning || Scottish || Compact || 48,208 || 51,880 || 56,422 || 1747    
|-
| The Courier || Regional || Morning || Scottish || Compact || 35,813 || 39,324 || 43,031 || 1801    
|-
| Greenock Telegraph || Local || Morning || Scottish || Tabloid || 8,959 || 9,555 || 10,511 || 1857    
|-
| Paisley Daily Express || Local || Morning || Scottish || Tabloid || 4,508 || 4,800 || 5,109 || 1874    
|-
| Evening Express || Local – Aberdeen || Evening || Scottish || Tabloid || 22,736 || 25,744 || 28,802 || 1879    
|-
| Glasgow Times || Local – Glasgow || Evening || Scottish || Tabloid || 20,874 || 23,696 || 27,733 || 1876    
|-
| Edinburgh Evening News || Local || Evening || Scottish || Tabloid || 16,660 || 18,362 || 21,803 || 1873    
|-
| Evening Telegraph || Local – Dundee || Evening || Scottish || Tabloid || 13,321 || 14,971 || 16,855 || 1877    
|-
| The Times (Scottish edition)  || UK – Quality || Morning || Scottish edition of UK newspaper || Compact || || || || 1785    
|-
| The Daily Telegraph  (Scottish edition) || UK – Quality || Morning || Scottish edition of UK newspaper || Broadsheet || || || || 1855    
|-
| i || UK – Quality || Morning || UK newspaper widely available in Scotland || Compact || || || || 2010    
|-
| The Guardian || UK – Quality || Morning || UK newspaper widely available in Scotland || Tabloid || || || || 1821    
|-
| The Financial Times || UK – Quality || Morning || UK newspaper widely available in Scotland || Broadsheet || || || || 1888     
|-
| Scottish Daily Mail || UK – Mid Market || Morning || Scottish edition of UK newspaper || Tabloid || || || || 1896  
|-
| Scottish Daily Express || UK – Mid Market || Morning || Scottish edition of UK newspaper || Tabloid || || || || 1900    
|-
| The Scottish Sun || UK – Popular || Morning || Scottish edition of UK newspaper || Tabloid || || || || 1964    
|-
| Daily Star of Scotland || UK – Popular || Morning || Scottish edition of UK newspaper || Tabloid || || || || 1978    
|-
| Scottish Daily Mirror || UK – Popular || Morning || Scottish edition of UK newspaper || Tabloid || || || || 1903  
|-
| Metro, Scottish Edition || UK – Free || Morning || Scottish edition of UK newspaper || Tabloid || || || || 1999    
|-
| The Morning Star || UK – Mid Market || Morning || Scottish edition of UK newspaper || Tabloid || || || || 1930    
|}

Traditionally newspapers could be divided into 'quality', serious-minded newspapers (usually referred to as 'broadsheets' due to their large size) and 'tabloids', or less serious newspapers. However, these definitions no longer apply, as several 'quality' papers in Scotland have followed the lead of The Independent by adopting a tabloid format (which some prefer to refer to as 'compact' to avoid being associated with their more downmarket peers). In Scotland, two broadsheet newspapers have made the switch to 'compact' format. The Scotsman did so in August 2004, and the Sunday Herald followed in November 2005.

In addition to newspapers published in Scotland, including Scottish editions of United Kingdom newspapers, a number of local newspapers published in other parts of the British Isles are widely available.

Sunday newspapers
{| class="sortable wikitable"
! Title !! Market type !! Location !! Format !! Scottish circulation
|-
| Scotland on Sunday || Scottish – Quality || Scottish || Broadsheet || style="text-align: right;" | 16,289    
|-
| The Sunday Post || Scottish – Mid Market || Scottish || Tabloid || style="text-align: right;" | 123,393    
|-
| Sunday Mail || Scottish – Popular || Scottish || Tabloid || style="text-align: right;" | 140,743    
|-
| Sunday National || Mid Market (pro-independence) || Scottish || Broadsheet || style="text-align: right;" |
|-
| The Sunday Times Scotland || UK – Quality || Scottish edition of UK newspaper || Broadsheet || style="text-align: right;" | 46,593    
|-
| The Observer || UK – Quality || UK newspaper widely available in Scotland || Tabloid || style="text-align: right;" | 11,772    
|-
| The Sunday Telegraph Scotland || UK – Quality || Scottish edition of UK newspaper || Broadsheet || style="text-align: right;" | 11,234    
|-
| Mail on Sunday Scotland || UK – Mid Market || Scottish edition of UK newspaper || Tabloid || style="text-align: right;" | 63,290    
|-
| Scottish Sunday Express || UK – Mid Market || Scottish edition of UK newspaper || Tabloid || style="text-align: right;" | 21,661    
|-
| Sun on Sunday || UK – Popular || UK newspaper widely available in Scotland || Tabloid || style="text-align: right;" | 142,272    
|-
| Daily Star Sunday || UK – Popular || UK newspaper widely available in Scotland || Tabloid || style="text-align: right;" | 19,299    
|-
| Scottish Sunday Mirror || UK – Popular || Scottish edition of UK newspaper || Tabloid || style="text-align: right;" | 7,523    
|-
| The People || UK – Popular || UK newspaper widely available in Scotland || Tabloid || style="text-align: right;" | 4,656    
|}

Local weekly newspapers

Aberdeen

Aberdeenshire

 Banffshire Journal
 The Buchanie
 Deeside Piper
 Donside Piper
 Ellon Times & East Gordon Advertiser
 Fraserburgh Herald
 Huntly Express
 Inverurie Herald
 Kincardineshire Observer
 Mearns Leader

Angus

 Angus County Press

Argyll and Bute

 Campbeltown Courier & Argyllshire Advertiser
 Dunoon Observer and Argyllshire Standard
 Helensburgh Advertiser
 Isle of Bute News
 The Ileach
 Oban Times

Clackmannanshire

 Alloa & Hillfoots Advertiser

Dumfries and Galloway

 Annandale Herald & Moffat News
 Annandale Observer
 Dumfries & Galloway Standard (bi-weekly)
 Dumfries Courier
 Eskdale and Liddesdale Advertiser
 Galloway Gazette
 Galloway News
 Stranraer and Wigtownshire Free Press

Dundee

East Ayrshire

 Cumnock Chronicle
 Kilmarnock Standard

East Dunbartonshire

 Kirkintilloch Herald
 Milngavie & Bearsden Herald

East Lothian

 East Lothian Courier

East Renfrewshire

 Barrhead News

Edinburgh

 Linlithgow Gazette - incorporating Bo'ness Journal and Queensferry Gazette

Falkirk

 Linlithgow Gazette - incorporating Bo'ness Journal and Queensferry Gazette
 Falkirk Herald - the largest local weekly newspaper in Scotland in terms of circulation and readership

Fife

 Central Fife Times and Advertiser – weekly tabloid newspaper and classified advertiser in the Cowdenbeath, Kelty and Lochgelly area
 Dunfermline Press – weekly tabloid newspaper for West Fife
 East Fife Mail – tabloid weekly sister paper of Fife Free Press for the Levenmouth area
 Fife Free Press – weekly tabloid newspaper for the Kirkcaldy area
 Fife Herald
 Glenrothes Gazette (Leslie and Markinch News) – tabloid sister weekly paper of Fife Free Press
 St Andrews Citizen

Glasgow

 The Digger – scandal sheet with stories of minor trials and arrests and gossip about local gangs
 Glasgow South & Eastwood Extra
 Glasgow Eyes – a picture news magazine featuring street/reportage photography/news/music and showbiz

Highlands

 Caithness Courier
 The Inverness Courier (bi-weekly)
 John O'Groat Journal
 Oban Times incorporating the Lochaber Times
 The Northern Times
 Rossshire Journal
 Strathspey & Badenoch Herald
 Ullapool News
 West Highland Free Press

Inverclyde

Midlothian

 Midlothian Advertiser

Moray
 
 Banffshire Advertiser
 Banffshire Journal
 Forres Gazette
 Northern Scot

North Ayrshire

 Ardrossan & Saltcoats Herald
 Arran Banner
 Irvine Herald & Kilwinning Chronicle
 Irvine Times
 Largs and Millport Weekly News

North Lanarkshire

 Airdrie & Coatbridge Advertiser
 Cumbernauld News & Kilsyth Chronicle
 Motherwell Times & Bellshill Speaker
 Wishaw Press

Orkney

 The Orcadian

Perth and Kinross

 Blairgowrie Advertiser
 Perthshire Advertiser (bi-weekly)
 Strathearn Herald

Renfrewshire

Gryffe Advertizer
 Paisley and Renfrewshire Gazette

Scottish Borders

 Berwickshire News
 Border Telegraph
 The Hawick Paper
 Peeblesshire News
 Southern Reporter

Shetland

 Shetland Times

South Ayrshire

 Ayr Advertiser incorporating Carrick Gazette & Troon Times 
 Ayrshire Post

South Lanarkshire

 East Kilbride News
 Hamilton Advertiser
 Lanark & Carluke Gazette
 Rutherglen Reformer
 Strathaven Echoes

Stirling

 Stirling News
 Stirling Observer (bi-weekly)

West Dunbartonshire

 Clydebank Post
 Dumbarton and Vale of Leven Reporter
 Lennox Herald

West Lothian

 Linlithgow Gazette - incorporating Bo'ness Journal and Queensferry Gazette
 West Lothian Courier

Western Isles

 Stornoway Gazette

Specialist newspapers
 The i-Witness - Muslim paper in English
 The Pink Paper - Edinburgh soccer paper, which shares its name with a separate gay and lesbian publication
 Scots Independent - mainly supporting the SNP
 Scottish Catholic Observer
 Scottish Socialist Voice - printed by the SSP
 Third Force News - newspaper serving the voluntary sector, non-party-political

UK-wide specialist newspapers widely available in Scotland
 The Economist - weekly news-focused magazine owned by Pearson PLC, founded by Scot James Wilson
 PinkNews - LGBT online newspaper
 Private Eye - Fortnightly satirical current affairs news magazine
 The Jewish Chronicle - aimed at Britain's Jewish community
 Racing Post – daily horse racing, greyhound racing and sports betting newspaper

University newspapers
Brig – University of Stirling
Gaudie – University of Aberdeen (see: Aberdeen University Students' Association)
Glasgow University Guardian – University of Glasgow
The Journal – University of Edinburgh, Heriot-Watt University, Edinburgh Napier University, Queen Margaret University, Edinburgh College of Art, University of Strathclyde and the University of Glasgow
The EDIT - Glasgow Caledonian UniversityThe Magdalen – University of Dundee (see: Dundee University Students' Association)qmunicate – University of Glasgow's Queen Margaret UnionThe Saint – University of St AndrewsStrathclyde Telegraph – University of StrathclydeStudent – University of EdinburghVeritas – Napier University

Defunct newspapers

 Aberdeen Citizen Allanwater Herald An Gàidheal Ùr - for speakers of Scottish Gaelic (monthly)
 Arbroath Herald Brechin Advertiser The Bulletin Business am The Buteman Carnoustie Guide & Gazette The Citizen East Lothian News Edinburgh Advertiser Edinburgh Courant Ellon Advertiser Fife & Kinross Extra Forfar Dispatch Glasgow Argus Glasgow Evening News The Gourock Times Hawick News The Highlander Highland News Inverness Herald Inverurie Advertiser Kirriemuir Herald Lothian and Peebles Times Mercurius Caledonius Montrose Review Nairnshire Telegraph North Ayrshire World The North Briton North Star Paisley People Perth Shopper Rossshire Herald Scottish Daily News Scottish Guardian Scottish Leader (3 January 1887 – 4 July 1894) - Edinburgh-based daily, Liberal and pro-home rule, established in competition with The Scotsman 
 Scottish Standard Selkirk Advertiser Strathkelvin Advertiser Sunday Scot Sunday Standard Turriff Advertiser West Lothian Herald & PostSee also
 List of newspapers in the United Kingdom
 List of magazines published in Scotland
 Media in Scotland
 Newspapers
 List of Scotland-related topics
 History of British newspapers
 List of left-wing publications in the United Kingdom
 List of right-wing publications in the United Kingdom

Further reading
Reid, Harry (2006) Deadline: the Story of the Scottish Press''. Edinburgh: Saint Andrew Press

References

External links
ThePaperboy.com UK newspaper directory
allmediascotland.com
National and local newspaper links
History of British newspapers
The Audit Bureau of Circulation provides circulation figures for Scottish newspapers. Their research is also reproduced in digested form at this Media Guardian index along with commentary.

Newspapers published in Scotland
Scotland
Newspapers in Scotland
Scotland
Newspapers